The 1977–78 Evansville Purple Aces men's basketball team represented the University of Evansville during the 1977–78 NCAA Division I men's basketball season. They were coached by first-time head coach Bobby Watson after the departure of Arad McCutchan, who had spent the previous 31 years as coach of the program. Former Purple Aces player Jerry Sloan had previously accepted an offer to become the new head coach but left following five days with the team. The season was the Purple Aces' first time playing in NCAA Division I after years of success in NCAA Division II competition.

The Purple Aces lost their first two games of the season against the Western Kentucky Hilltoppers and the DePaul Blue Demons. The Purple Aces' only win of the season came in a home game on December 6, 1977, against the Pittsburgh Panthers. On December 10, 1977, the Purple Aces lost an away game to the 11th-ranked Indiana State Sycamores.

On December 13, 1977, all 14 members of the varsity team and some members of the staff were killed in the Air Indiana Flight 216 crash. The Purple Aces had been travelling to Nashville, Tennessee, to play the Middle Tennessee Blue Raiders when the plane crashed shortly after takeoff from the Evansville Regional Airport and killed all passengers on board. Watson was the only coach on the flight as assistant coaches Mark Sandy, Stafford Stephenson and Bernie Simpson were on scouting assignments. The only Purple Aces player who was not on the flight, freshman David Furr, was killed in a car accident two weeks later.

Roster

Schedule and results

|-
!colspan=9 style=| Non-conference regular season

References

Evansville Purple Aces men's basketball seasons
Evansville
Evansville
Evansville
Victims of aviation accidents or incidents in the United States